Haihui Temple could be several Buddhist temples：

Haihui Temple (Xiangtan), in Xiangtan, Hunan, China

Haihui Temple (Jiujiang), in Jiujiang, Jiangxi, China

Haihui Temple (Yangcheng County), in Yangcheng County, Shanxi, China

Haihui Temple (Yanggu County), in Yanggu County, Shandong, China

Buddhist temple disambiguation pages